Otto A. Harrass (July 13, 1869 – September 19, 1910) was a member of the Wisconsin State Assembly.

Biography
Harrass was born on July 13, 1869, in Milwaukee, Wisconsin, where he along the way received a religious-based education. During the Spanish–American War, he served in the United States Army. Harrass died in Milwaukee on September 19, 1910. He was buried in Milwaukee.

Political career
Harrass was elected to the Assembly for Milwaukee County's Second District in 1906 and 1908. He was a Republican.

References

Politicians from Milwaukee
Republican Party members of the Wisconsin State Assembly
Military personnel from Wisconsin
United States Army soldiers
American military personnel of the Spanish–American War
1869 births
1910 deaths
Burials in Wisconsin
19th-century American politicians